The 2005–06 Danish 1st Division season was the 61st season of the Danish 1st Division league championship and the 20th consecutive as a second tier competition governed by the Danish Football Association.

The division-champion, Vejle BK, and runner-up, Randers FC, promoted to the 2006–07 Danish Superliga. The teams in the 14th, 15th and 16th places, LFA, BK Skjold and Brønshøj BK, relegated to 2006–07 Danish 2nd Divisions, and will be divided between the 2nd Division east and west, based on location.

Table

Top goalscorers

See also 
 2005–06 in Danish football
 2005–06 Danish Superliga
 2005–06 Danish Cup
 2004–05 Danish 1st Division
 2005–06 Danish 2nd Divisions

External links 
 Danish Football Association's database
 Standings
 Fixtures
 Topscorers
  Standings at haslund.info

Danish 1st Division seasons
Denmark
2005–06 in Danish football